Jack Robinson (born 21 June 2001) is English professional footballer who plays as a defender for Carlisle United, on loan from  club Middlesbrough.

Career
After playing youth football for Nunthorpe Athletic, he joined Middlesbrough's academy at the age of 13. He signed his first professional contract with the club in summer 2020. He made his debut for the club on 8 May 2021 as a substitute in a 3–0 Championship defeat to Wycombe Wanderers.

On 28 August 2021, Robinson signed for National League side Yeovil Town on loan until 10 January 2022. On 13 January 2022, the loan was extended for the remainder of the 2021–22 season.

On 3 January 2023, Robinson joined EFL League Two side Carlisle United on loan for the remainder of the 2022-23 season.

Style of play
Robinson can play as a centre back or as a left back.

Career statistics

References

External links

Living people
2001 births
English footballers
Association football defenders
Middlesbrough F.C. players
Yeovil Town F.C. players
Carlisle United F.C. players
English Football League players
National League (English football) players